David Torosyan (born September 23, 1950 in Yerevan, Armenian SSR) is a retired Olympic medalist boxer for the Soviet Union of Armenian descent.

Torosyan trained at Trudovye Rezervy in his hometown of Yerevan. He became well-known after winning the Soviet Youth Championships gold medal and European Junior Championships silver medal in 1970. Torosyan joined the USSR national boxing team shortly afterward.

After joining the Soviet national boxing team, Torosyan won a bronze medal at the 1974 World Amateur Boxing Championships. He was selected by the Soviet Olympic team to compete at the 1976 Summer Olympics. Torosyan advanced to the semifinals with relative ease, but was then controversially disqualified for a low blow. He won an Olympic bronze medal.

Torosyan worked as a boxing coach in Armenia after retiring from his boxing career. He later emigrated to the United States, settling in Glendale, California, where he opened a gym. Torosyan coached Armenian-born American boxer Vanes Martirosyan, who competed at the 2004 Summer Olympics.

1976 Olympic Games Results

Round of 64: bye
Round of 32: Defeated Hassen Sheriff (Ethiopia) WO
Round of 16: Defeated Giovanni Camputaro (Italy) RSC 2
Quarterfinal: Defeated Jong Jo-Ung (North Korea) 5-0
Semifinal: Lost to Ramón Duvalón (Cuba) DQ 2 (was awarded bronze medal)

References

External links
 Sports-Reference.com
 databaseOlympics.com

1950 births
Living people
Sportspeople from Yerevan
Soviet male boxers
Flyweight boxers
Olympic boxers of the Soviet Union
Boxers at the 1976 Summer Olympics
Olympic bronze medalists for the Soviet Union
Olympic medalists in boxing
Soviet Armenians
Armenian male boxers
AIBA World Boxing Championships medalists
Medalists at the 1976 Summer Olympics